The 2020 Tulsa mayoral election was held on August 25, 2020 to elect the mayor of Tulsa, Oklahoma. One-term incumbent mayor G. T. Bynum ran for re-election against a number of candidates. Bynum won re-election outright, negating the need for a runoff.

Candidates

Declared 
 G. T. Bynum (Republican), incumbent mayor
 Craig Immel (Independent), construction manager and U.S. Green Building Council member
 Ken Reddick (Republican), project manager and candidate for city council in 2018
 Greg Robinson (Democratic), staff member at Met Cares and Barack Obama 2012 campaign organizer
 Paul Tay (Independent), perennial candidate
 Ty Walker, restaurateur and U.S. Navy veteran
 Zackri Whitlow, insurance broker

Endorsements

Results

References

External links 
 G. T. Bynum for Mayor
 Craig Immel for Mayor
 Ken Reddick for Mayor
 Greg Robinson for Mayor 
 Ty Walker for Mayor 
 Zackri Whitlow for Mayor

Tulsa
Tulsa
2020